Donald Hope Laidlaw  LL.B., B.Litt.(Oxon) (6 August 1923 – 14 April 2009) was a lawyer, businessman and politician in the State of South Australia.

He was born to Mr. and Mrs. Lyndley Hope Laidlaw of  Victoria Avenue, Unley Park, and educated at St. Peter's College, then studied Law and Literature at Adelaide University and Magdalen College, Oxford. He was called to the Bar in 1948.

During World War II he served in the AIF. Intelligence Corps as a Japanese interpreter.

Laidlaw was elected as a Liberal candidate to the Legislative Council in July 1975 and served until November 1982.

He was appointed an Officer of the Order of Australia (AO) in the 1989 Australia Day Honours for "service to secondary industry, the South Australian Parliament and to the community".

He was a member of the Royal Adelaide Golf Club, The Royal and Ancient Golf Club of St Andrews and served on the boards of numerous boards, including Adelaide Brighton Cement, Quarry Industries, Adelaide Wallaroo Fertilizers, Bennett and Fisher and Johns Perry Ltd.

Family
He married (Audrey) Vivienne Perry LLB (29 July 1925 – ), a daughter of Frank Tennyson Perry, on 2 February 1948. Their eldest daughter Diana Laidlaw was a noted State politician. He married again, to Vivienne's sister Margaret Pauline (18 July 1917 – 16 October 2011).

References 

20th-century Australian lawyers
Liberal Party of Australia members of the Parliament of South Australia
Members of the South Australian Legislative Council
1923 births
2009 deaths
20th-century Australian politicians
Officers of the Order of Australia